Rod Hickman is an American politician who is currently the representative-elect to the Mississippi State Senate from Mississippi's 32nd Senate district. A Democrat, he won a special election in 2021 to replace Sampson Jackson, who retired on June 30, 2021. He lives in Macon, Mississippi. Before being elected, he was a law professor at Tougaloo College and the Mississippi University for Women and a prosecutor for Noxubee County, Mississippi.

Electoral history

References

External links

Democratic Party Mississippi state senators
Living people
Year of birth missing (living people)